Pharmafabrik is an independent record label based in Slovenia and founded in 1993, most noted for their comprehensive and critically acclaimed Fabriksampler compilation albums with artists Final, Lull, KK Null, Alexei Borisov, Nordvargr, Surgeon, Eraldo Bernocchi, Franck Vigroux, Mike Browning, PureH, Chris Wood, Psychedelic Desert, Pharmakustik, P.C.M., Daniel Buess, The Cherry Blues Project and others.

Compilation albums  
 Various – FabrikSampler 1 (2006)
 Various – Fabriksampler V2 (2008)
 Various – Fabriksampler V4 (2011)

See also 
 List of record labels
 List of electronic music record labels

External links 
 
 Complete 
 Interview with Skyd about Pharmafabrik

References

Slovenian independent record labels
Electronic music record labels
Ambient music record labels
Noise music record labels
Industrial record labels
Experimental music record labels